Gymnoscelis derogata is a moth in the family Geometridae. It is found on Borneo, Peninsular Malaysia, the north-eastern Himalayas, Sulawesi, New Guinea and in Queensland.

The larvae have been recorded feeding on Macadamia species.

Subspecies
Gymnoscelis derogata derogata (Borneo, Peninsular Malaysia, Himalaya)
Gymnoscelis derogata abrogata Prout, 1958 (New Guinea)
Gymnoscelis derogata griseifusa Prout, 1958 (Sulawesi)

References

Moths described in 1866
Gymnoscelis